Natalia Ayesha Grosvenor, Duchess of Westminster (née Phillips; born 8 May 1959), is a British aristocrat, philanthropist and winemaker. She is the widow of the 6th Duke of Westminster and mother of the 7th Duke. As of 2021, the Duchess's family, specifically her son, were 12th on the Sunday Times Rich List with a net worth of £10.045 billion.

Early life
Born Natalia Ayesha Phillips, she is the youngest daughter of Lieutenant Colonel Harold "Bunnie" Phillips and Georgina "Gina" Wernher. Her paternal grandparents were Colonel Joseph Phillips and Mary Bryce, daughter of John Pablo Bryce. Her maternal grandparents were Sir Harold Wernher, 3rd Bt, and Countess Anastasia de Torby, morganatic daughter of Grand Duke Michael Mikhailovich of Russia. Tally, as she is known to friends and family, had an older brother, Nicholas (1947–1991), and three older sisters, including Marita Knight and the late Alexandra Hamilton, Duchess of Abercorn. She and her siblings are direct descendants of poet Alexander Pushkin and Afro-Russian engineer Abram Gannibal.

Marriage and issue
Natalia met Gerald Grosvenor, Earl Grosvenor, at a ball at Blenheim Palace in 1977. When Natalia's maternal grandmother heard she was going out with the heir to the Duke of Westminster, she told her "Don't let him go. Don't let him go, you must come down and bring him to lunch".

They married the next year at St Mary's Church, Luton, near her family seat, Luton Hoo, on 17 October 1978. Natalia wore a gown designed by Sarah Butler and an antique diamond and spinel tiara which Grosvenor had bought for her that had belonged to Princess Catherine Bagration. Notable guests at the wedding included Princess Alice, Duchess of Gloucester, Prince and Princess Michael of Kent, and Lord Mountbatten, whose granddaughter, India Hicks, was a bridesmaid. Upon marriage, Natalia was styled as Countess Grosvenor.

Four months later, Grosvenor's father died and he became the 6th Duke of Westminster, thus making Natalia the Duchess of Westminster. They have four children and six grandchildren:
 Lady Tamara Katherine Grosvenor (born 20 December 1979), married Edward van Cutsem, son of Hugh van Cutsem, on 6 November 2004 at Chester Cathedral. They have three children:
 Jake Louis Hannibal van Cutsem (born 21 May 2009)
 Louis Hugh Lupus van Cutsem (born 17 April 2012)
 Isla van Cutsem (born December 2015)
 Lady Edwina Louise Grosvenor (born November 1981), married Daniel Snow on 27 November 2010. They have three children:
 Zia Snow (born 13 October 2011)
 Wolf Robert Snow (born 9 September 2014)
 Orla Snow (born December 2015)
 Hugh Richard Louis Grosvenor, 7th Duke of Westminster (born 29 January 1991)
 Lady Viola Georgina Grosvenor (born 12 October 1992)

Activities
The Duchess supports many charitable endeavours in Cheshire and across the United Kingdom, these include the Alex Moulton Charitable Trust and the Hopsice of the Good Shepherd.

The Duchess is godmother of William, Prince of Wales, in turn, Diana, Princess of Wales, was godmother of her daughter, Lady Edwina, and her son, Hugh, is godfather of Prince George of Wales.

The Duchess owns a vineyard in Portofino called "La Cappelletta" where she produces Vermentino della Cappelletta, a Ligurian Vermentino.

Ancestry

References 

1959 births
Living people
Natalia
British duchesses by marriage
British winemakers
People from London
Wernher family
Natalia
English people of German descent
English people of Russian descent
English people of Cameroonian descent
English people of Peruvian descent
Wives of knights